Vallier  is a topographic surname of French and Old English origin, referring to someone who lives in a valley. Variants include Vallière, Vallières, de Vallière, and LaVallière. 

Notable people with the surname Vallier include:
John Vallier (1920–1991), English classical pianist and composer 
Joseph Vallier (1869–1935), French lawyer and politician
Lenny Vallier (born 1999), French footballer
Willy Vallier (1920-1968), Italian (Südtirol) artist

Notable people with the surname Vallière include:

Jean Vallière (died 1523), Augustinian monk 
Louis-Florent de Vallière (1719–1775), Governor General of the French colony of Saint-Domingue (Haiti)

References

See also
 Vale (disambiguation)

Toponymic surnames